Prolixibacteraceae  is a family of 11 bacterial genera in the order of Bacteroidales.

References

Bacteroidia
Bacteria families